The British and Foreign School Society (BFSS) offers charitable aid to educational projects in the UK and around the world by funding schools, other charities and educational bodies. It was significant in the history of education in England, supporting free British Schools and teacher training in the 19th century; it continued in the latter role until the 1970s. In the 19th century it fiercely competed with the National Society for Promoting Religious Education, which had the support of the established Church of England, the local parishes, and Oxford and Cambridge universities. Both institutions promoted the monitorial system, whereby few paid teachers supervise the senior students who in turn taught the younger students.

Current status
As its teacher training colleges have closed and the Society has gathered more capital, it has used its funds to provide grants for educational projects around the world. Details of its activities can be found in its Annual Reports and the rest of its website.

Archives and museum
The Society's Archive Centre is situated close to Brunel University's Uxbridge campus. This holds school and college records, together with artefacts and curriculum materials with relevance to modern education.

The British Schools Museum is set in a cluster of school buildings on a site in Hitchin, Hertfordshire, dating from 1810, when a Lancasterian School was founded. The Lancasterian Schools were taken over by the British and Foreign School Society. The British Schools buildings remaining in Hitchin include a unique Lancasterian Schoolroom (1837), a Galleried Classroom 1853 and other buildings from 1857 and 1905. The Hitchin British Schools Trust runs the museum for public visitors and for classes of visiting children to sample education in the 19th century.

History 

Joseph Lancaster's School in Borough Road, Southwark, London, established in 1798, was an important development in the provision of universal free education for children. A teacher training institution, Borough Road College, was added soon afterwards in 1801.

The Lancasterian system (or monitorial system) used older children who had already been given some education to teach the younger children. It was designed to provide a cheap basic education with limited resources and numbers of teachers.

The Society for Promoting the Lancasterian System for the Education of the Poor was formed in 1808 to continue Lancaster's lead. The Society was founded by Joseph Fox, William Allen and Samuel Whitbread. It was supported by several evangelical and non-conformist Christians, including William Wilberforce. In 1814, the Society was renamed the British and Foreign School Society for the Education of the Labouring and Manufacturing Classes of Society of Every Religious Persuasion. During the 19th century, based on non-sectarian principles, the Society started a number of "British Schools" and teacher training institutions, which in many places maintained an active rivalry with the "National Schools" of the Established Church. It also established schools abroad, helping with the provision of staff and other support.

When the government assumed responsibility for elementary education with the Elementary Education Act 1870, the British schools became locally administered board schools.
The BFSS continued its role by supporting teacher training institutions for the next century, but these institutions have now closed or merged with other colleges. In particular, Borough Road College, having moved from Borough Road to Isleworth in west London, merged with the West London Institute of Higher Education in 1976. This in turn became part of Brunel University in 1995.

References

Further reading 
 

Religious organizations established in 1808
Educational organisations based in the United Kingdom
1808 establishments in the United Kingdom